STC Salgótarján is a professional football club based in Salgótarján, Nógrád County, Hungary, that competes in the Nemzeti Bajnokság III, the third tier of Hungarian football.

History
STC Salgótarján is going to compete in the 2017–18 Nemzeti Bajnokság III.

On 28 March 2018, the club announced its withdrawal from the 2017-18 Nemzeti Bajnokság III season.

The results of the 2017–18 Nemzeti Bajnoksáh III were cancelled for the club.

Honours

Domestic
Nógrád I:
Winner (1): 2016–17

Managers

 György Véber 2015

Season results
As of 6 August 2017

References

External links
 Profile on Magyar Futball

Football clubs in Hungary
Association football clubs established in 2007
2007 establishments in Hungary